Peter John Alan Robinson is an Anglican priest serving as the Dean of Derby; he was previously Archdeacon of Lindisfarne.

Born in 1961, he was educated at Tiffin Boys' Grammar School, Kingston-upon-Thames, and 
St John's College, Cambridge, and worked in the oil industry before being ordained in 1996. After a curacy in North Shields he worked with the Urban Ministry and Theology Project in Byker until his archidiaconal appointment.

Robinson was installed as Dean of Derby on 20 July 2020.

References

1961 births
People educated at Tiffin School
Alumni of St John's College, Cambridge
British businesspeople in the oil industry
Archdeacons of Lindisfarne
Provosts and Deans of Derby
Living people